The Canutillo Formation is a geologic formation that is exposed in the Franklin Mountains near El Paso, Texas. The formation is Middle Devonian in age.

Description
It is unconformably overlain by the Percha Formation. The Canutillo Formation likely correlates with the Onate Formation.

Fossils
The formation is fossiliferous, but few fossils are time diagnostic. Fossils include abundant Leiorhynchus and other brachiopods and a few pelecypods.

History of investigation
The formation was first described in his dissertation by L.A. Nelson in 1937 for outcrops in the Franklin Mountains. Nelson assigned all beds between the Silurian Fusselman Formation and the Mississippian Helms Formation to the Canutillo. Nelson formally published the definition in 1940 and extended the outcrop range to the Hueco Mountains. In 1945, F.V. Stevenson restricted the formation to the Franklin Mountains. In 1949, Lowell R. Laudon and Arthur L. Bowshwer restricted the formation to a sequence of just  of soft gray siltstone.

See also

 List of fossiliferous stratigraphic units in Texas
 Paleontology in Texas

Footnotes

Devonian Texas
Devonian southern paleotemperate deposits